Nazemi is a surname. Notable people with the surname include:

Afshin Nazemi (born 1971), Iranian football coach
Latif Nazemi (born 1947), Afghan Persian poet and literary critic

See also
Nazmi